A bottle opener is a device that enables the removal of metal bottle caps from glass bottles. More generally, it might be thought to include corkscrews used to remove cork or plastic stoppers from wine bottles.

A metal bottle cap is affixed to the rim of the neck of a bottle by being pleated or ruffled around the rim. A bottle opener is a specialized lever inserted beneath the pleated metalwork, which uses a point on the bottle cap as a fulcrum on which to pivot.

Varieties
There are several distinct designs of such bottle openers. Wall mounted openers are typically found behind bars in pubs, whilst hand-tool bottle openers tend to be found and used in domestic environments. The functional elements of bottle openers (a tooth or lip to catch the underside of the cap, a fulcrum across which to exert the force that will remove the cap, and usually a lever for mechanical advantage) tend to be consistent, although they can vary in design and aesthetics.

Crown cork opener

Invented at the same time as the crown cork, it is the original bottle opener. But as well as being portable it also comes as a fixed device to be attached to vertical surfaces, often with a tray to catch the bottle tops. It does not open wine bottles.

A simple opener is a piece of metal with a rectangular or rounded opening in one end and a solid handle large enough to be gripped between the thumb and forefingers on the other. The opening contains a lip that is placed under the edge of the bottle top, pulling it off when upward force is applied to the handle end of the opener.

Speed opener ('bar blade')

The speed opener is a flat blade of steel approximately 4 cm wide and 16 cm long with a thumb hole at one end and a letterbox cut at the other to remove the crown seals from a bottle. They go under the names 'speed opener', 'popper', 'mamba', ‘bar key’, and most popularly 'bar blade'. The thumb hole may be used to pull bottles out of ice, by placing the hole over the neck of the bottle, then lifting it.  The speed opener is widely used by professional bartenders in Canada, the United States, and the UK. Carried in the pocket or against the body or on a zip string, it is both convenient and fast for the modern bartender. It is advantageous in that it is easy to open several bottles in rapid succession, and with more flair than other types of bottle opener. Consequently, 'bar blading' is often part of bar flair routines.

Wall-mounted

Works the same as the lever variation, except that it is attached to the wall, to allow for simpler bottle-opening, which can be done with one hand. The bottle cap can fall into a bottle cap catcher mounted below the opener, or it can be retrieved after removal from the bottle. 
A variant to this are similar types of openers mounted on older vending machines.

Multi-opener
Also known as a beverage opener, these usually includes a bottle opener of the simple bottle opener style but includes various other openers such as for plastic bottles or metal beverage cans.

Technique 
Under most use, a bottle opener functions as a second-class lever: the fulcrum is the far end of the bottle opener, placed on the top of the crown, with the output at the near end of the bottle opener, on the crown edge, between the fulcrum and the hand: in these cases, one pushes up on the lever.

However, one may instead use it as a first-class lever, by placing the near end on the top of the crown, and the far end under the crown edge, then pushing down on the lever (thus the output is on the opposite side of the fulcrum from the hand). This is particularly used with bar blades, which form an obtuse angle. Mechanically, this is a marginally less effective lever, as the effort arm is shorter, but the action of pushing down is marginally anatomically easier.

While most lever-type bottle openers can be used in either configuration, the designed use can be determined if one of the edges is curved, in which case this edge is designed to sit in the middle of the crown, as the curve concentrates pressure, deforming the crown, and a curved edge does not connect with as much of the crown edge, hence being suboptimal and slipping more frequently if used to connect with the crown edge. This difference can be seen in comparing the traditional opener and contemporary bar blade at right.

Corkscrews

Waiter's friend

The 'waiter's friend' or 'wine key' consists of a flat housing (often plastic covered) similar to a Swiss army knife with a corkscrew and lever (which doubles as crown cork opener) with either a knife or auto-foiler to remove the foil top of wine bottles and then the cork. Designed to be screwed in to within 1 full rotation before the end of the screw (more will pierce the bottom of the cork and result in extra flotsam on the surface of the wine) before levering out the cork.

Mounted corkscrew

This tool is used by businesses that need to open a large volume of wine efficiently and without waste or breakage. It is a large brass tubular device, fixed at a 45° angle to the bar, with a lever pivoted halfway and extending towards the user. The bottle's neck is inserted firmly in the lower aperture of the tube and the lever pulled down firmly and steadily to the bottom. This drives a corkscrew into the cork at a regular depth each time. When the lever is returned to its original position it extracts the cork. When the bottle is removed pull the lever to expose the cork at the bottom, it loosens the cork and returns the lever firmly to its starting position, whereupon the cork will then fall out.

Twin prong cork puller

The twin prong cork puller, also called the Butler's Friend or Ah-so, is shaped like a large key with a squared oval handle about 5 cm × 8 cm, and two thin metal strips, approximately 10 cm long, 5 mm wide, and 0.5 mm thick, descending in tandem from the center of the handle. The two strips are spread open and then wiggled into the space between the cork and the bottle on either side. Once fully in place, a turn and pull of the handle causes friction to turn the cork and pull it out of the bottle.

Injuries 
New Zealand has had in average 40 injuries recorded by the Accident Compensation Corporation per year due to injuries while opening a beer bottle that required to remove a metal lid. Two ophthalmologists Cam Loveridge-Easther and Sacha Moore wrote a letter recommending for warnings to be put on bottles.

References 

Bottles
Food preparation utensils
Domestic implements